John Charleton is the name of:

 John Charleton, 1st Baron Cherleton (1268–1353), British baron
 John Charleton, 2nd Baron Cherleton (c. 1300–1360), British baron
 John Charleton, 3rd Baron Cherleton (c. 1336–1374), British baron
 John Charleton, 4th Baron Cherleton (1362–1401), British baron